Salman the Persian was a Persian companion (Sahaba) of the Islamic prophet Muhammad.  He was raised as a Zoroastrian in Sasanian Persia, then attracted to Christianity, and then converted to Islam after meeting Muhammad in the city of Yathrib, which later became Medina. During some of his later meetings with the other Sahabah, he was referred to by the kunyah Abu ʿAbdullah ("Father of Abdullah"). At his suggestion a trench was dug (a Sasanian military technique) around Medina when it was attacked by the Meccan Quraysh in the Battle of the Trench.

According to some traditions, he was appointed as the governor of Al-Mada'in in Iraq, and in popular tradition, Muhammad considered Salman as being part of his household. He was a follower of Ali ibn Abi Talib after the death of Muhammad.

Birth and early life

Salman was a Persian born with the name Rouzbeh Khoshnudan in the city of Kazerun in Fars Province, or Isfahan in Isfahan Province. In a hadith, Salman also traced his ancestry to Ramhormoz. The first sixteen years of his life were devoted to studying to become a Zoroastrian magus or priest after which he became the guardian of a fire temple. Three years later in 587 he met a Nestorian Christian group and was impressed by them. Against the wishes of his father, he left his family to join them. His family imprisoned him afterwards to prevent him but he escaped.

He traveled around the Middle East to discuss his ideas with priests, theologians and scholars in his quest for the truth. During his stay in Syria, he heard of Muhammad, whose coming had been predicted by Salman's last Christian teacher on his deathbed. Afterwards and during his journey to the Arabian Peninsula, he was betrayed and sold to a Jew in Medina. After meeting Muhammad, he recognized the signs that the monk had described to him. He converted to Islam and secured his freedom with the help of Muhammad.

Abu Hurairah is said to have referred to Salman as "Abu al-Kitabayn" ("the father of the two books"; that is, the Bible and the Quran), and Ali is said to have referred to him as "Luqman al-Hakeem" ("Luqman the wise," a reference to a wise man mentioned in the Quran). Whenever people inquired about his ancestry, Salman is said to have replied: "I am Salman, the son of Islam from the child of Adam."

Career

Salman came up with the idea of digging a great trench around the Medina, to defend the city against the army of 10,000 Arabian non-Muslims. Muhammad and his companions accepted Salman's plan because it was safer, and there would be a better chance that the non-Muslim army would have a larger number of casualties.

While some sources gather Salman with the Muhajirun, other sources narrate that during the Battle of the Trench, one of Muhajirun stated "Salman is one of us, Muhajirun", but this was challenged by the Muslims of Medina (also known as the Ansar). A lively argument began between the two groups with each of them claiming Salman belonged to their group and not to the other one. Muhammad arrived on the scene and heard the argument. He was amused by the claims but soon put an end to the argument by saying: "Salman is neither Muhajir nor Ansar. He is one of us. He is one of the People of the House."

Salman participated in the conquest of the Sasanian Empire, and became the first governor of Sasanid capital Ctesiphon, after its fall at the time of the second Rashidun Caliph, Umar ibn Al-Khattab. However, according to some other sources, after Muhammad's death, he disappeared from public life until 656, when Ali became the Caliph, and appointed Salman as the governor of Al-Mada'in at the age of 88.

Works

He translated the Quran into Farsi or Persian, thus becoming the first person to interpret and translate the Quran into a foreign language. Salman is said to have written the following poem on his enshrouding cotton:
I am heading toward the Munificent, lacking a sound heart and an appropriate provision,
While taking a provision (with you) is the most dreadful deed, if you are going to the Munificent

Salman used to cut the hair of Muhammad at the time, inspiring plates in Turkish barber shops with the verse:
Every morning our shop opens with the basmala-, 
Hazret-i Salman-i Pak is our pir and our master.

Death

One source states that he died in 32 A.H. / 652 or 653 C.E. in the Julian calendar. while another source says he died during Uthman's era in 35 A.H. / 655 or 656 C.E. Other sources state that he died during Ali's reign. His tomb is located in Salman Al-Farsi Mosque in Al-Mada'in, or according to some others, in Isfahan, Jerusalem or elsewhere.

Views

Shi'ite
Shi'ites, Twelvers in particular, hold Salman in high esteem for a hadith attributed to him, in which all twelve Imāms were mentioned to him by name, from Muhammad. Salman, along with Abu Dharr, Ammar ibn Yasir, and Miqdad ibn Aswad, is considered to be the four loftiest of the Shi'a. Ali Asgher Razwy, a 20th-century Shia Twelver Islamic scholar states:

Sufi
Salman is also well known as a prominent figure in Sufi traditions. Sufi orders such as Qadriyya and Bektashiyya and Naqshbandi have Salman in their Isnad of their brotherhood. In the Oveyssi-Shahmaghsoudi order and Naqshbandi order, Salman is the third person in the chain connecting devotees with Muhammad. The members of  associations also regarded Salman as one of their founders, along with Ali ibn Abi Talib.

Druze
Druze tradition honors several "mentors" and "prophets", and Salman is honored as a prophet, and as an incarnation of the monotheistic idea.

Bahá’í
In the Kitáb-i-Íqán, Bahá'u'lláh honours Salman for having been told about the coming of Muhammad:

As to the signs of the invisible heaven, there appeared four men who successively announced unto the people the joyful tidings of the rise of that divine Luminary. Rúz-bih, later named Salmán, was honoured by being in their service. As the end of one of these approached, he would send Rúz-bih unto the other, until the fourth who, feeling his death to be nigh, addressed Rúz-bih saying: 'O Rúz-bih! when thou hast taken up my body and buried it, go to Hijáz for there the Day-star of Muhammad will arise. Happy art thou, for thou, shalt behold His face!'

Ahmadiyya
In Ahmadiyya, Salman is mentioned in connection with the faith of the Persian people:

See also
 
 List of non-Arab Sahabah
 Sulaym ibn Qays
 Salman the Persian (TV series)

References

External links

 Salmān al-Farsi

Translators of the Quran into Persian
Iranian Muslims
Iranian former Christians
People from Kazerun
654 deaths
568 births
6th-century Iranian people
7th-century Iranian people
Converts to Christianity from Zoroastrianism
Converts to Islam from Christianity
Muhajirun
Non-Arab companions of the Prophet
Governors of the Rashidun Caliphate
Prophets in the Druze faith